The 2023 Barton Bulldogs men's volleyball team represents Barton College in the 2023 NCAA Division I & II men's volleyball season. The Bulldogs, led by interim head coach J.T. Deppe, were picked to finish eighth in the Conference Carolinas coaches preseason poll.

Season highlights
Will be filled in as the season progresses.

Roster

Schedule
TV/Internet Streaming information:
All home games will be streamed on Conference Carolinas DN. Most road games will also be televised or streamed by the schools television or streaming service.

 *-Indicates conference match.
 Times listed are Eastern Time Zone.

Announcers for televised games
Tusculum: Brian Stayton
Lincoln Memorial: Adam Haley 
Randolph-Macon: 
Merrimack: 
Hawai'i: 
Queens: 
North Greenville: 
Belmont Abbey: 
Erskine: 
Emmanuel: 
Mount Olive: 
Lees-McRae: 
King: 
George Mason: 
Emmanuel: 
Erskine: 
Belmont Abbey: 
North Greenville: 
Queens: 
King: 
Lees-McRae: 
Tusculum:
Lincoln Memorial: 
Mount Olive:

References

2023 in sports in North Carolina
2023 NCAA Division I & II men's volleyball season
Barton
Barton Bulldogs